The 1998–99 Stanford Cardinal men's basketball team represented Stanford University in the 1998–99 NCAA Division I men's basketball season.  The team finished 1st in the conference.

Roster

Schedule and results

|-
!colspan=12 style=| Regular season

|-
!colspan=12 style="background:#8C1515;"| NCAA tournament

Schedule Source:

Rankings

*AP does not release post-NCAA Tournament rankings^Coaches did not release a week 2 poll

1999 NBA draft

References

Stanford Cardinal
Stanford Cardinal men's basketball seasons
Stanford Cardinal men's basketball
Stanford Cardinal men's basketball
Stanford